Ziarat-e Kot-e Gorg (also Romanized as Zīārat-e Kot-e Gorg) is a small village in The Mohammadabad Rural District, in the Central District of Anbarabad County, Kerman Province, Iran. At the 2006 census, its population was 414, in 85 families.

References 

Populated places in Anbarabad County